Guinea-Bissau competed at the 2019 African Games held from 19 to 31 August 2019 in Rabat, Morocco. In total, five athletes represented the country in three sports and they won one silver medal. The country finished 34th in the medal table.

Medal summary

Medal table 

|  style="text-align:left; width:78%; vertical-align:top;"|

|  style="text-align:left; width:22%; vertical-align:top;"|

Athletics 

Jessica Inchude was scheduled to compete in athletics in the women's shot put and women's discus throw events but she did not compete in either event.

Taekwondo 

One athlete competed in Taekwondo.

Wrestling 

Three athletes represented Guinea-Bissau in wrestling. 

Mbunde Cumba won the silver medal in the Men's freestyle -65 kg event. The country finished in 9th place in the wrestling medal table.

Men's freestyle

References 

Nations at the 2019 African Games
2019
African Games